Sir Richard Meredith, 2nd Baronet (died 1679) was an English politician who sat in the House of Commons from 1656 to 1659.

Meredith was the son of Sir William Meredith, 1st Baronet of  Leeds Abbey, Kent and his  wife Susanna Barker of London. He was educated at Queens' College, Cambridge and admitted at Gray's Inn on 10 March 1649.

In 1656, Meredith was elected Member of Parliament for Kent in the Second Protectorate Parliament and in 1659 he was elected MP for Sandwich in the Third Protectorate Parliament.

Meredith succeeded to the baronetcy on the death of his father in 1675 and lived at Leeds Castle. He died in 1679 and was buried at Leeds Church on 5 September 1679.

Meredith married Susanna Skippon daughter of Philip Skippon, of Foulsham, Norfolk, in 1655. His sons William, Richard (a certified lunatic) and Roger succeeded successively to the baronetcy. Roger and another son Thomas were also Members of Parliament.

References

 

1679 deaths
Baronets in the Baronetage of England
English MPs 1656–1658
English MPs 1659
Year of birth missing
Alumni of Queens' College, Cambridge
People from Leeds, Kent